Jeotgalibacillus campisalis is a Gram-positive, endospore-forming, rod-shaped, moderate halophilic and motile bacterium from the genus of Jeotgalibacillus which has been isolated from a marine solar saltern from Korea.

References 

Bacillales
Bacteria described in 2004